George Lynford Throop (born November 24, 1950) is a retired American professional baseball player.

Throop was drafted by the Kansas City Royals in the 16th round of the 1972 Major League Baseball Draft after attending Pasadena City College and California State University, Long Beach. He spent nearly his entire career with the Royals organization. However, about half of his career appearances in the Major Leagues, and more than half of his 42 MLB innings pitched, came after a trade to the Houston Astros in April 1979.

He allowed 41 hits and 25 bases on balls, and notched three saves to accompany his three wins as a big-leaguer.

Sources

1950 births
Living people
Baseball players from California
Billings Mustangs players
Charleston Charlies players
Houston Astros players
Jacksonville Suns players
Long Beach State Dirtbags baseball players
Kansas City Royals players
Major League Baseball pitchers
Omaha Royals players
Pasadena City Lancers baseball players
San Jose Bees players
Tiburones de La Guaira players
American expatriate baseball players in Venezuela
Waterloo Royals players
Pasadena High School (California) alumni